The women's 400 metres event at the 2002 World Junior Championships in Athletics was held in Kingston, Jamaica, at National Stadium on 16, 17 and 18 July.

Medalists

Results

Final
18 July

Semifinals
17 July

Semifinal 1

Semifinal 2

Heats
16 July

Heat 1

Heat 2

Heat 3

Heat 4

Participation
According to an unofficial count, 27 athletes from 18 countries participated in the event.

References

400 metres
400 metres at the World Athletics U20 Championships